Betty is an American teen comedy television series created by Crystal Moselle. The series is based on Moselle's 2018 feature film Skate Kitchen, which was in turn based on her 2016 short film That One Day. It includes most of the cast of the original feature film, and focuses on the Gen Z all-girl group's efforts to stand out in New York's predominantly male world of skateboarding. The series premiered on HBO on May 1, 2020. In June 2020, the series was renewed for a second season which premiered on June 11, 2021. In August 2021, the series was canceled after two seasons.

Betty received positive critical reception, and was nominated for a Gotham Award for Shortform Breakthrough Series.

Plot
Betty follows "a tight-knit group of girl skaters and follows their everyday lives as they navigate the male-dominated world of skateboarding. The title comes from the derogatory nickname sometimes thrown at them by men."

Cast

Main
 Dede Lovelace as Janay, a bold vlogger
 Kabrina Adams as Honeybear, a shy aspiring filmmaker
 Nina Moran as Kirt, a flirtatious ladykiller and a "lovable stoner"
 Ajani Russell as Indigo, a low-level weed dealer from a wealthy family
 Rachelle Vinberg as Camille, a serious skater who tries to fit in with the male skaters

Recurring
 Caleb Eberhardt as Donald (season 1)
 Edmund Donovan as Bambi (season 1)
 Katerina Tannenbaum as Ash
 Reza Nader as Farouk
 Alexander Cooper as Charlie
 CJ Ortiz as Luis
 Brenn Lorenzo as Ceila (season 1)
 Jules Lorenzo as Yvette (season 1)
 Raekwon Haynes as Philip
 Karim Callender Abdul as Dante (season 1)
 Noa Fisher as Peachy (season 1)
 Kai Espion Monroe as Kai (season 1)
 Lil Dre as Tai
 Andrew Darnell as Sylvester
 Roblé Ali as Jzabel
 Isabel Palma as Shelby
 Rad Pereira as Victoria
 Moises Acevedo as Micah

Guest
 Ben Sinclair as Biker ("Ladies on Fire")
 Tony Hawk as Skater ("Ladies on Fire")
 Amy Sedaris as Woman on Trail ("Sweet Tooth")
 Gina Gershon as Oracle ("Sweet Tooth")

Episodes

Series overview
<onlyinclude>

Season 1 (2020)

Season 2 (2021)

Production

Development
On August 14, 2019, it was reported that HBO had given Betty a series order consisting of six episodes.The series is created, directed, executive produced by Crystal Moselle who also co-wrote and directed Skate Kitchen. The series is a spinoff of the film and features many of the same actors, with some tweaks to various storylines. Lesley Arfin, Igor Srubshchik Jason Weinberg were executive producers alongside Moselle. Production companies involved with the series are Untitled Entertainment, A Dreamy Crystal Moselle Sequence, and Arfin Material.

The series premiered on May 1, 2020. On June 18, 2020, HBO renewed the series for a second season which premiered on June 11, 2021. On August 24, 2021, HBO canceled the series after two seasons.

Casting
Alongside the initial series announcement, it was reported that Rachelle Vinberg, Nina Moran, Moonbear, Dede Lovelace, and Ajani Russell would reprise their roles from Skate Kitchen as series regulars. As with the film, the actors play fictionalized versions of themselves.

Filming
The series was filmed on-location in New York City. The show has no sets.

Reception

Critical reception

On Rotten Tomatoes, the first season holds an approval rating of 97% based on 30 reviews, with an average rating of 7.15/10. The website's critical consensus reads, "Earnest, audacious, and effortlessly cool, Betty captures the spirit of skating and friendship with style." On Metacritic, it has a weighted average score of 77 out of 100 based on 14 reviews, indicating "generally favorable reviews". Betty was noted by Vogue for depicting the friendships of women, several of them queer or of color, "in a naturalistic way." Ashlie D. Stevens wrote of the series in Salon, ""Betty" isn't fast-paced or bursting with dramatic turns, but therein lies its appeal. This is a show that is about watching a new generation of women empower themselves and the women around them, seemingly in real time." Robert Lloyd of the Los Angeles Times noted while "there is no nudity, that old HBO staple", that a strength of the show is "its main themes are friendship, self-knowledge, identity, equality and freedom...It feels innocent, which is not to say naive. And it is appropriately, almost casually exhilarating."

The New York Times and Time named the first season to end-of-year "best new series" lists.

The second season has a 100% approval rating on Rotten Tomatoes based on 5 reviews, with an average rating of 8/10. On Metacritic, it has a weighted average score of 74 out of 100 based on 7 reviews, indicating "generally favorable reviews".

Ratings

Season 1

Awards and nominations

Notes

References

External links 
 
 

2020 American television series debuts
2020s American LGBT-related comedy television series
2021 American television series endings
English-language television shows
HBO original programming
Live action television shows based on films
Skateboarding mass media
Television series about teenagers
Television shows set in New York City